Elisabetta Barbato (11 September 1921, in Barletta, Apulia – 1 February 2014, in Rome) was an Italian operatic soprano.

Barbato made her debut at Teatro dell'Opera di Roma in 1944, singing the role of Garsenda in Zandonai's Francesca da Rimini.

She first performed in the United States in the title role of Tosca with the San Francisco Opera.

Barbato provided the sung parts for Anna Magnani's role in the film Avanti a lui tremava tutta Roma (1946).

References

1921 births
2014 deaths
Italian operatic sopranos
People from Barletta
20th-century Italian women opera singers